The Washington Elm was a tree on Cambridge Common in Cambridge, Massachusetts, that lived approximately 210 years and died in 1923.

History
Beginning as early as the 1830s, it became popular legend that "under this tree Washington first took command of the American Army" (supposedly the words of Henry Wadsworth Longfellow). The publication of the fictional "eye-witness" journal The Diary of Dorothy Dudley in 1876 furthered the legend. Although George Washington did take command of the army on 3 July 1775, there is no official documentation stating that this event took place under the tree.

In 1923, the tree was very fragile and diseased. Workers from the parks department of Cambridge were cutting two of the remaining limbs. Upon cutting the second limb, the entire tree fell over onto its iron fence and brought the Boston Elevated Railway cable to within 15 feet (4.57 m) of the ground. The tree was divided up into approximately 1000 pieces, and these were distributed to all states and their legislatures. The cross-section of the tree was sent to Mount Vernon. About 150 pieces were given over-the-counter, a few hundred were mailed throughout the country, and some fraternal organizations received pieces as well. Root shoots were sent to locations throughout the nation, and some of them still thrive today. An offshoot tree in the state of Washington was used to create the tree seen here today.

In 1925, the legend was openly discredited at the Cambridge Historical Society (CHS), when Samuel F. Batchelder read a paper he later reprinted as The Washington Elm Tradition: "Under This Tree Washington First Took Command of the American Army" Is It True?. Batchelder revealed the forgeries in the tales told about Washington and the tree, in short calling the myth altogether not realistic, but the beliefs persist today. Many websites are outdated in stating that the tree still exists and that it is indeed where Washington first took command.

Today, a plaque embedded in the pavement of Garden Street (at its Mason St. intersection) marks where the tree used to stand. The Cambridge Historical Commission (CHC) has called the association of Washington and the elm a "myth" and stated that "the image of the tree remains a symbol of patriotism in Cambridge."

Descendant trees
Of the 1,000 pieces that were distributed, many are still standing today. 

Bellingham, WA - 1621 Eldridge Ave. While the story of how the particular tree came to live in Bellingham is unclear, a tree still standing (as of 2017) at this address is said to be a descendant of the Washington Elm.

Loveland, CO  205 E Eisenhower Blvd, Loveland, CO 80537. The Washington Elm Tree in the Walgreens parking lot between Lincoln and Cleveland avenues has been here since a sickly version of the tree first came to Loveland in 1932. Root shoots from the original tree were sent to DAR chapters throughout the nation, including Loveland's Namaqua Chapter, and the tree was planted in the yard of what was then the Lincoln School. The tree is one of the few Washington Elm offshoots still thriving in the nation, but another DAR member is working to carry on the tree's heritage. Corrine Yahn, who teaches geology at Front Range Community College, works with Front Range laboratory coordinator Susan Brown on micropropagation. For about a year, Yahn said they've been using samples from the Loveland elm to essentially try and clone the tree.

See also
 List of elm trees
 List of individual trees

References

External links and further reading
 Howard Mansfield, "The Bones of the Earth". Shoemaker Hoard, 2004, 
 
 
 

Cambridge, Massachusetts
American Revolutionary War sites
Individual elm trees
1920s individual tree deaths
Individual trees in Massachusetts